Isaac Hopkins Bronson (October 16, 1802 – August 13, 1855) was a United States representative from New York and a United States district judge of the United States District Court for the District of Florida and the United States District Court for the Northern District of Florida.

Education and career

Born on October 16, 1802, in either Rutland, New York, or Waterbury, Connecticut, Bronson attended the common schools and read law in 1822. He was admitted to the bar and entered private practice in Watertown, New York from 1822 to 1837.

Congressional service and state judicial service

Bronson was elected as a Democrat from New York's 18th congressional district to the United States House of Representatives of the 25th United States Congress, serving from March 4, 1837, to March 3, 1839. He was Chairman of the Committee on Territories  for the 25th United States Congress. He was an unsuccessful candidate for reelection in 1838 to the 26th United States Congress. He was appointed a Judge for the Fifth Judicial District of New York on April 18, 1838, serving from 1839 to 1840.

Federal judicial service

Bronson moved to St. Augustine, St. John's County, Florida Territory, and some years later moved to Palatka, Putnam County, Florida Territory. Bronson was a Judge of the United States District Court for the Eastern District of Florida Territory from 1840 to 1845.

He was confirmed by the United States Senate on August 8, 1846, and received his commission the same day. His service terminated on August 13, 1855, due to his death in Palatka, Florida. He was interred in the Episcopal Church Cemetery.

References

Sources

 
 

1802 births
1855 deaths
Judges of the United States District Court for the District of Florida
Judges of the United States District Court for the Northern District of Florida
United States federal judges appointed by James K. Polk
19th-century American judges
People from Palatka, Florida
Democratic Party members of the United States House of Representatives from New York (state)
19th-century American politicians
United States federal judges admitted to the practice of law by reading law